Arleta (3 March 1945 – 8 August 2017; born Argyro-Nicoleta Tsapra) was a Greek musician, author and book illustrator.

Biography
Arleta was born in Athens on 3 March 1945 and studied at the Athens School of Fine Arts.

She published her first album of her own compositions (Η Αρλέτα τραγουδά, Arleta sings) in 1966 and became one of the leading figures of the Greek New Wave during the 1960s. At the beginning of her career she worked with many well-known Greek composers like Giannis Spanos, George Kontogiorgos, Manos Hatzidakis and Mikis Theodorakis. Her first great successes came with songs whose music was written by Lakis Papadopoulos and lyrics by Marianina Kriezi. She performed with great success in the Athens boîte scene. In 1997 she published a book, Από πού πάνε για την Άνοιξη (How to Get to Spring), which was based on her songwriting and included her own illustrations.

On 11 February 2008, just a few minutes before a planned performance at Volos, Arleta suffered a stroke, which left her in hospital for six months and partly paralysed her for a year. with recovery after a lengthy hospitalization and year of rehabilitation. In January 2017, she suffered another stroke and remained in hospital, where she died on 8 August 2017, aged 72.

Discography 
 Τραγουδά η Αρλέτα (Arleta sings) (Lyra, 1966)
 Αρλέτα Νο. 2 (Arleta No. 2) (Lyra, 1967)
 Στο Ρυθμό του Αγέρα (In the Rhythm of the Wind) (Lyra, 1968)
 12+1 Τραγούδια του Μάνου Χατζιδάκι (12+1 Songs of Manos Hatzidakis) (Lyra, 1969)
 Έξη Μέρες (Six Days) (Lyra, 1970)
 Ταξιδεύοντας (Travelling) (Lyra, 1976)
 Romancero Gitano (Lyra, 1978)
 Ένα Καπέλο με Τραγούδια (A Hat with Songs) (Lyra, 1981)
 Περίπου (Almost) (Lyra, 1984)
 Τσάι Γιασεμιού (Jasmine Tea) (CBS, 1985)
 Ζητάτε Να Σας Πω (You Ask Me to Say to You) (CBS, 1987)
 Δέκα και μία νύχτες (Ten and One Nights) (CBS, 1989)
 Εκτός Έδρας (Away) (CBS, 1989)
 Άσε τα Κρυφά Κρυμμένα (Let secrets remain hidden) (Columbia, 1991)
 Μετά Τιμής (With Honour) (Portrait, 1993)
 Έμπορος Ονείρων (Trader of Dreams) (Ακτή, 1995)
 Και Πάλι Χαίρετε (Hello to You Again) (Legend, 2009)
 Demo (Lyra, 2010)

Illustrations
Bertolt Brecht «Ο Μπαρμπα-Έντε» (Uncle Eddie's Moustache) – Children's Book (Οδυσσέας Editions, 1979; in Greek)
Vladimir Mayakovsky «Το Αλογάκι-Φωτιά» (The Fire Horsey) – Children's Book (Οδυσσέας Editions, 1986; in Greek)

See also
Horse Stories
Praise (film)
Keti Chomata
Mariza Koch
Rena Koumioti

References

1945 births
2017 deaths
20th-century Greek women singers
Greek entehno singers
Greek illustrators
Greek women songwriters
Singers from Athens
Greek LGBT songwriters
Greek LGBT singers
21st-century Greek LGBT people